Mikael Simpson (born 1974 in Holstebro) is a Danish songwriter, singer, film composer, musician and radio host. He began his musical career as a guitarist for the indie band Luksus, which disbanded in 2001. Since then, he has released four albums as a solo artist, earning him popularity in Denmark. He has performed live with Trentemøller on his Last Resort world tour and collaborates with Fritjhof Toksvig, dj Buda, Lulu rouge and his band Sølvstorm.

Discography

Albums
Studio albums

Live albums

Compilation albums

Collaboration albums
{| class="wikitable"
!align="center" rowspan="2" width="10"|Year
!align="center" rowspan="2" width="200"|Album
!align="center" colspan="1" width="20"|Peak positions
|-
! scope="col" style="width:3em;font-size:90%;" | DEN
|-
| style="text-align:center;"|2002
| Vi sidder bare her' (Leth, Toksvig & Simpson)
| style="text-align:center;"|32
|}

Remix albums
2005: B-sider, udtag og meget triste radiomix 
2009: Slaar skaar – Udvalgte numre i andre versioner2011: Udvalgte blaaSingles

 Others 
 Composed the score for the documentary about a Danish refugee camp by Fenah Ahmed 
 Composed the score for Rene Hjerter (Pure Hearts) with Jeppe Kaas
 Composed the score for gaven (The Gift) a film by Niels Graabøl
 Mikael Simpson also wrote the lyrics for Sweeter than sweet by Lulu Rouge and Moan by Trentemøller featuring Ane Trolle

Appearances 
 Luksus – EP (1996)
 Luksus – Repertoire (1998)
 Lise Westzynthius – Heavy dream (2002)
 Various artist – Nordkraft (2005)
 Various artists – Andersens drømme (2005)
 Trentemøller – The Last Resort (2006)
 Various artists – Dmdk (2006)
 Various artists – Værsgo 2 (2006)
 Pet Shop Boys – Soddom (Trentemøller mix) (2006)
 Various artists – Stella polaris 2 (2006)
 Trentemøller – Cronicles (2007)
 Liv Lykke – Kai Normann Andersen (2007)
 Ekko -I know I Am Human (2007)
 Various artists – Frie børn leger bedst (2007)
 Various artists – Sound off Copenhagen (2008)
 Lulu Rouge – Bless You (2008)
 Trentemøller – Live at Roskilde (2008)
 Depeche Mode – Wrong (Trentemøller remix) (2009)

Remixes
 Nikolaj Nørlund – Verdensmester (with low ranger) (2001)
 Loveshop – Bellavista sol (with Ekko) (2003)
 Under Byen – Legesag (2003)
 Kashmir – Jewel Drop (2005)
 Ataf – Gade capitain (2006)
 Rhonda Harris – Waiting round to die (2006)
 Lulu Rouge – Bless you (2007)
 Trentemøller – Moan (2007)
 The crooked spoke – The one you left behind (2008)
 Trentemøller – Even though you're with another girl (2010)
 Sleep Party People – 10 Feet Up (2011)
 Panamah – Børn af natten (2013)
 Jacob Bro – Evening song (2013)
 Peter Sommer – Hvorfor løb vi (2013)

 Awards 
 2003 The "Steppeulven" Critics Award for hope of the year
 2004 Danish Music Awards for songwriter of the year
 2005 Best album the "Steppeulven" Critics Award
 2005 Best alternative artist Danish National Radio p3 guld
 2005 Composer of the year – The "Steppeulven" Critics Award
 2006 Songwriter of the year Danish Music Awards
 2006 Song of the year (for the song "VI 2") The "Steppeulven" Critics Award
 2006 Main prize winner by Danish National Radio
 2007 Best album – The "Steppeulven" Critics Award
 2007 Singer of the year voted by the readers of music magazine Gaffa 2007 Bodil Film Award for best music with Jeppe Kaas for the film Rene Hjerter'' (Pure Hearts) directed by Kenneth Kaintz

References

External links
 

Danish songwriters
1974 births
Living people
People from Holstebro